Ebbets Field was a Major League Baseball stadium in the Flatbush section of Brooklyn, New York. It is mainly known for having been the home of the Brooklyn Dodgers baseball team of the National League (1913–1957). It was also home to five professional football teams, including three NFL teams (1921–1948). Ebbets Field was demolished in 1960 and replaced by the Ebbets Field Apartments, the site's current occupant.

History

Construction
 Ebbets Field was bounded by Bedford Avenue to the east, Sullivan Place to the South, Cedar Street (renamed McKeever Place in 1932) to the west, and Montgomery Street to the north. After locating the prospective new site to build a permanent stadium to replace the old wooden Washington Park, Dodgers' owner Charles Ebbets acquired the property over several years, starting in 1908, by buying lots until he owned the entire block. 

The land included the site of a garbage dump called Pigtown, so named because of the pigs that once ate their fill there and the stench that filled the air. At the groundbreaking, the site was described as containing several old houses, shanties, goats, and tomato cans, and although the streets bordering the field were mapped, two of them had not been built yet.

Construction began on March 4, 1912. The cornerstone, a piece of Connecticut granite that held newspapers, pictures of baseball players, cards, telegrams, and almanacs, was laid on July 6, 1912. At the cornerstone-laying ceremony, Ebbets said that the ballpark was going to be ready for play on September 1, and that Brooklyn was going to win the National League pennant in 1913.

Neither of Ebbets' predictions were correct: on August 29, 1912, as the deadline drew near and it was obvious that the ballpark was not even close to being finished, it was announced that Ebbets had sold shares in the team to Stephen W. and Edward J. McKeever, who had built their fortune in contracting and were able to speed along the construction to make up for an iron workers' strike during the summer. Ebbets sold the brothers 50% of the team, which led to management troubles years later, but by early 1913, Pigtown had been transformed into Ebbets Field, where some of baseball's greatest dramas took place.

Newspaper coverage in the spring of 1913 was filled with glowing praise about the new park, calling it "A Monument to the National Game" and predicting it could last 200 years: the actual lifetime turned out to be 47 years.

Opening
The first game played was an inter-league exhibition game against the New York Yankees on April 5, 1913, played before an overcapacity of 30,000 fans, with 5,000 more who had arrived but were not able to get in. After a loss against the Yankees in another exhibition game on April 7 in front of about 1,000 fans on a very cold day, the first game that counted was played on April 9 against the Philadelphia Phillies, with Brooklyn losing, 1–0. 

When the park was opened, it was discovered that the flag, keys to the bleachers, and a press box had all been forgotten. The press box level was not added until 1929. The seating area was initially a double deck from past third base, around home plate, and all the way down the right side. There was an open, concrete bleacher stand extending the rest of the way down the third base side to the outer wall, but no seating in left field or centerfield. 

The right field wall was fairly high due to the short foul line (around ) necessitated by the street immediately beyond it, but had no screen or scoreboard at first. The ballpark was built on a sloping piece of ground. The right field wall made up the difference, as the right field corner was above street level.

As with Boston's Fenway Park and Detroit's Tiger Stadium, two ballparks that opened one year earlier than Ebbets Field, the intimate configuration prompted some baseball writers to refer to Ebbets Field as a "cigar box" or a "bandbox."

Use

Ebbets Field was the scene of some early successes, as the Dodgers, also called the "Robins" after long-time manager Wilbert Robinson, won National League championships in 1916 and 1920. The seating area was expanded in the 1920s, a boom time for baseball when many ballparks were expanded. The double deck was extended from third base around the left field corner, across left field, and into center field, allowing right-hand hitters to garner many more home runs. By the 1940s, a big scoreboard had been installed in right field, as well as a screen atop the high wall which made home runs to right field a tougher accomplishment. Additional rows of seating across left field reduced that area by about 15 feet, to the delight of right-handed sluggers.

The park's first night game was played on June 15, 1938, drawing a crowd of 38,748. Johnny Vander Meer of the visiting Cincinnati Reds pitched his second consecutive no-hitter in that game, a feat that has never been duplicated in Major League Baseball. It was also in 1938 that Hilda Chester, one of the earlier sports "superfans," became a regular attendee when Larry MacPhail brought Ladies' Days to Ebbets Field, only charging women a ten-cent admission on those days.

After the early successes of the Dodgers, the team slid into hard times. Things continued that way for two decades, until new ownership first brought in promotional wizard MacPhail in 1938, and then, after MacPhail's wartime resignation, player development genius Branch Rickey in 1943. In addition to his well-known breaking of the color line by signing Jackie Robinson, Rickey's savvy with farm systems (as with his prior work for the St. Louis Cardinals) produced results that made the Brooklyn Dodgers "Bums" a perennial contender, which they continued to be for several years.

The Dodgers won pennants in 1941 (under MacPhail), 1947, 1949, 1952, 1953, 1955 and 1956. They won the 1955 World Series, their only world title, and were within two games (in 1950) and a playoff heartbreak (in 1951) of winning five National League pennants in a row (1949–53) and matching the cross-town Yankees' achievement during that stretch. Ebbets Field also hosted the 1949 Major League Baseball All-Star Game.

Demise

The Dodgers found themselves victims of their own success soon thereafter, as Ebbets Field never seated more than 35,000 people, and the constraints of the neighborhood made its expansion impossible. It also had almost no automobile parking for Dodger fans who had moved east to suburban Long Island, though it was near a subway station. Walter O'Malley, who obtained majority ownership of the Dodgers in 1950, announced plans for a privately owned domed stadium at the Atlantic Yards in Brooklyn (currently the site of Barclays Center), where a large market was being torn down. 

New York City Building Commissioner Robert Moses refused to help O'Malley secure the land, instead wanting the Dodgers to move to a city-owned stadium in Flushing Meadows in the borough of Queens (the future site of Shea Stadium and Citi Field). O'Malley refused to consider Moses' proposal, famously telling him "We are the Brooklyn Dodgers, not the Queens Dodgers!" 

As a result, O'Malley began to flirt publicly with Los Angeles, using a relocation threat as political leverage to win favor for a Brooklyn stadium. Ultimately, O'Malley and Moses could not come to agreement on a new location for the stadium, and the club moved west to Los Angeles after the 1957 season. During their last two years in Brooklyn, the Dodgers played several games each year in Jersey City, New Jersey's Roosevelt Stadium, which was a tactic by O'Malley to force Moses to acquiesce and allow a new stadium to be built.

Ebbets Field was sold by O'Malley to Marvin Kratter for about $2,000,000 on October 31, 1956. The deal included a five-year lease that allowed the Dodgers to move out as soon as a proposed Downtown Brooklyn stadium was ready for business and Kratter to raze the ballpark and redevelop the land for a $25 million housing project beginning in 1961. The team left for Los Angeles after the 1957 season.

With the Dodgers leaving for Los Angeles, O'Malley urged Horace Stoneham, owner of the Dodgers' long-time crosstown rivals, the New York Giants, to also move west: Stoneham, who was having stadium and financial difficulties of his own, agreed, and moved the Giants to San Francisco after the 1957 season.

The departure of the Dodgers was followed by a "twilight" phase in which the park sporadically hosted soccer, as well as baseball at various levels: high school, college, and a handful of Negro league games, featuring a team formed by Roy Campanella. In one of those games, Satchel Paige made a special guest pitching appearance.

The demolition of Ebbets Field began on February 23, 1960. More than 35 years after the Dodgers had left Brooklyn, in a case deciding the use of the Brooklyn Dodgers' trademark, Constance Baker Motley, a federal judge in the Southern District of New York, called O'Malley's relocation of the franchise from its historic home to Los Angeles "one of the most notorious abandonments in the history of sports".

According to The Greatest Ballpark Ever: Ebbets Field and the story of the Brooklyn Dodgers by Bob McGee, Saul Leisner was assigned to auction off Ebbets Field (structure and contents) on April 20, 1960. Leisner began the auction at 11:15 am by climbing an eight-foot ladder and holding a gavel. Estimates were that over 500 people gathered around the marble rotunda. Locker room stools, benches, team banners, seats, bricks, bats, caps, team photos, balls, and a brownstone cornerstone of the stadium were included in the items for sale. Leisner stated that it was the saddest day of his life, and it was a difficult task for him, as he had been a faithful fan of the Brooklyn Dodgers and was heartbroken when the team relocated.

Subsequent use of site
The Ebbets Field Apartments were built on the former Ebbets Field site and were opened in 1962. They remain under private ownership with the same name and should not be confused with the New York City Housing Authority's Jackie Robinson Houses in Harlem. However, Middle School 320, across McKeever Place, was renamed Jackie Robinson Intermediate School. In January 2014, the street sign that once stood at the corner of McKeever Place and Montgomery Street was sold at auction for $58,852.08.

Legacy

Ebbets Field was one of several historic major league ballparks demolished in the 1960s, but more mythology and nostalgia surround the stadium and its demise than possibly any other defunct ballpark.

A great deal of history happened at Ebbets Field during its 45 years. Of the many teams that uprooted in the 1950s and 1960s, the Dodgers have probably had the largest number of public laments over their fans' heartbreak over losing their team. Several decades later, Roger Kahn's acclaimed book The Boys of Summer and Frank Sinatra's song "There Used to Be a Ballpark" mourned the loss of places like Ebbets Field, and of the attendant youthful innocence of fans and players alike. 

The story of Ebbets Field and the Brooklyn Dodgers' move to Los Angeles were also chronicled by historian Doris Kearns Goodwin, figured into the plot of the film Field of Dreams, and were featured in an entire episode of Ken Burns' public-television documentary Baseball, as well as a 2007 HBO documentary called Brooklyn Dodgers: Ghosts of Flatbush.

Danny Kaye's 1962 song about the Los Angeles Dodgers contains this line exhorting his team to win: "Come on, you Flatbush refugees!"

In 2006, the Dodgers matched the years they played at Ebbets Field with their years in Dodger Stadium. The New York Mets' duration in Shea Stadium (1964–2008) was the same as that of the Dodgers in Ebbets Field.

When the New Jersey Nets of the National Basketball Association moved to Brooklyn in 2012, it marked a return of major-league professional sports to the borough after a 55-year absence.

Other sports at Ebbets Field
Ebbets Field also hosted three pro football teams – the New York Brickley Giants for one game in 1921, the Brooklyn Lions/Horsemen in 1926, and the Brooklyn Dodgers/Tigers from 1930 to 1944. However, it was used more frequently for collegiate match-ups, and was home base for Manhattan College's football team in the 1930s.

The stadium also hosted numerous soccer games, including the U.S. National Challenge Cup soccer tournament, now known as the Lamar Hunt U.S. Open Cup. Bethlehem Steel F.C. from Pennsylvania of the American Soccer League won its sixth and final National Challenge Cup title, on April 11, 1926, scoring a convincing 7–2 victory over Ben Miller F.C. of St. Louis in the final before more than 18,000 fans.

On June 7, 1931, over 10,000 fans came out to Ebbets Field to watch Celtic of Scotland defeat Brooklyn Wanderers 5–0.

On June 17, 1947, the first known televised soccer game in the US took place when Hapoel Tel Aviv lost to the American League Stars 2–0. On June 18, 1948, Liverpool of England beat Djurgården of Sweden 3–2 in front of 20,000 fans. On October 17 of that year, the U.S. national team beat the Israel national team in front of 25,000 fans. On May 8, 1955, Sunderland of England beat the American League Stars 7–2. On May 17, Sunderland drew 1-1 with 1. FC Nürnberg of Germany. 

On May 25, 1958, Manchester City of England lost to Hearts of Scotland 6–5 in front of more than 20,000 patrons. The winners received the Empire State Cup, which can be seen in the Heart of Midlothian FC Museum. On June 28, 1959, Napoli of Italy lost to Rapid Vienna of Austria 1–0 in front of 18,512, and game officials were attacked afterwards. At the rematch three days later in front of 13,000 people, Napoli tied Rapid Vienna 1–1, in one of the last events held there.

Gaelic football was also played at Ebbets Field. On June 24, 1931, the All-Ireland champion County Kerry team defeated Kildare by a score of 18–3 with an attendance of 2,500 fans under floodlights in a night game.

Ebbets Field also hosted nearly 90 fight cards in its history, from 1915 to 1947.

Dimensions
A detailed plan of the new ballpark was published in the Brooklyn Daily Eagle for January 3, 1912, p. 21. The right field line was to be  from home plate, the left field line , and to the front of the intended triangle-shaped center field bleachers the plan said  "+ or −".

When the ballpark opened in 1913, the outfield was bounded by bare concrete walls all around, which would soon be covered with advertising. The triangular center field was used for the flag pole, with just a short fence in front of it, no bleachers. There was a large door in deep right center field, at the one place where the outfield and the sloping Bedford Avenue were at the same elevation. By 1920, several rows of wooden bleachers had been constructed inside the left field wall, which the newspapers called "circus seats".

In the spring of 1931, the Dodgers began expanding Ebbets Field. They demolished the old concrete bleachers beyond third base as well as the "circus seats". They built an extension of the main double-deck stands, which stretched across left and center fields, leaving a notch for the big door in deep right center field. Once this work was done, the general layout was fairly well set. The left field corner had a unique arrangement, with the foul line actually running atop the box seat railing to the foul pole. A new door in left center field once had a sign reading . Above the street-exit door in the deep center field notch was a sign reading .

The last changes came in 1948, when several rows of seats were installed in front of the outfield stands, reducing the left and center dimensions to their final distances. The 399 marker above the deep center field door was painted over, while a 376 marker was added to the right corner of the seating area wall.

References

Further reading
 Green Cathedrals, by Phil Lowry.
 Ballparks of North America, by Michael Benson.
 Old Ballparks, by Lawrence Ritter.
 The Zodiacs, by Jay Neugeboren.
 The Greatest Ballpark Ever: Ebbets Field and the Story of the Brooklyn Dodgers, by Bob McGee.

External links

 Ebbets Field Information
 YouTube Video Saying Goodbye to Ebbets Field
 Personal papers of Walter O'Malley, former Dodger owner
 American Soccer History Archives

Defunct baseball venues in the United States
Defunct Major League Baseball venues
Sports venues in Brooklyn
Defunct college football venues
Defunct National Football League venues
Defunct soccer venues in the United States
Defunct sports venues in New York (state)
Demolished sports venues in New York (state)
Demolished buildings and structures in Brooklyn
Former sports venues in New York City
American football venues in New York City
American Football League (1936) venues
Baseball venues in New York City
Boxing venues in New York City
Jewel Box parks
Soccer venues in New York City
Brooklyn Dodgers stadiums
Brooklyn Dodgers (NFL)
New York Brickley Giants
Manhattan Jaspers football
St. John's Red Storm football
Crown Heights, Brooklyn
Flatbush, Brooklyn
Jackie Robinson
Sports venues completed in 1913
Sports venues demolished in 1960
1913 establishments in New York City
1957 disestablishments in New York (state)